Stian Bam (born 27 May 1977), is a Namibia-born South African actor. He is best known for the roles in the films Verraaiers, Blood and Glory, My Father's War and The Story of Racheltjie De Beer.

Personal life
Bam was born on 27 May 1977 in Walvis Bay, Namibia. Both his mother and father were teachers. He graduated from the University of Stellenbosch with a Bachelor's degree in drama and theatre. In 2006, he won the Fleur du Cap Award for Most Promising Student.

He is married to Truda Serfontein, a jeweler, where the wedding was celebrated on 28 March 2009. The couple has one boy: Sofia and one girl: Jannes. They later divorced in 2020. In that year, he started a relationship with Handré Basson, a 23-year-old student from Stellenbosch.

Career
In 2012, he made the film debut with Verraaiers. After that he made supportive appearances in the films; Die Laaste Tango, Uitvlucht, Blood and Glory, My Father's War and Liewe Lisa. In 2019, he acted in the film The Story of Racheltjie De Beer by playing the role "Herman". The film received critics acclaim and Bam won the award for the Best Actor at the Silwerskerm Festival 2019. In 2020, he was nominated for the SAFTA Golden Horn Award for Best Actor in Feature Film category at the South African Film and Television Awards (SAFTA).

In television, he has starred in the serial Lot en Babbel directed by Nicola Hanekom, and then in Spyt directed by Brink Scholtz. In 2008, he joined the cast of popular SABC2 soap opera 7de Laan and played the villain role "Dawid Greef" for many years. He left the role in 2010 after two years. However he returned to the soapie in 2016 with the role. In 2013, he made the lead role "Andre Fourie" in kykNET series Die Boland Moorde.

In theatre, he appeared in many stage plays since 2003. Some of them include: The Kentucky Cycle (2003), Die Kersieboord (2004), Bloeiende Lente (2005), Slaghuis (2006), Altyd Jonker (2006), Festen (2007), Lang Dagreis na die Nag (KKNK 2008), Saad (2008), Die Sendeling (2011), Skollies (2011), Spyt (2010-2011), Lot (2011-2012), Betésda (2010, 2012), Babbel (2012), Die Rebellie van Lafras Verwey ( 2012), Die Vrou Vantevore (2013), Trippie (KKNK 2013), Stretch marks: Grips from a Pregnancy (KKNK 2013), macbeth.slapeloos (2014-5), Die Gangsters (2016), and Pa (Woordfees 2017). In 2007, he received the KKNK Kanna award as Best Actor for his roles in the plays, Slaghuis and Die Storm.

Apart from that, Stian involved in some radio dramas for "Radio Without Borders" such as, Murder in the Studio, Seduction, The Stanford Story, Anastasia, New Beginnings, A Shopping Trolley Christmas and Everyone's Story.

Filmography

References

External links
 IMDb

Living people
South African male film actors
1977 births
South African male television actors
South African male stage actors